This is the results breakdown of the local elections held in the Basque Country on 22 May 2011. The following tables show detailed results in the autonomous community's most populous municipalities, sorted alphabetically.

Overall

City control
The following table lists party control in the most populous municipalities, including provincial capitals (shown in bold). Gains for a party are displayed with the cell's background shaded in that party's colour.

Municipalities

Barakaldo
Population: 99,321

Basauri
Population: 42,452

Bilbao
Population: 353,187

Donostia-San Sebastián
Population: 185,506

Errenteria
Population: 39,020

Getxo
Population: 80,277

Irun
Population: 60,938

Portugalete
Population: 47,856

Santurtzi
Population: 47,101

Vitoria-Gasteiz
Population: 238,247

Juntas Generales

References

Basque Country
2011